Samuele Sereni (born 5 January 1988) is an Italian footballer who plays as a defender.

Club career
Sereni started his career in local Arezzo Gio. He was loaned to fourth-tier Figline for 2 years, before he could made his professional debut in the Lega Pro. On the summer of 2010, Serie B side Grosseto signed him, but he played only 2 match on the second tier. In January, he returned to Lega Pro, to Pisa. He spent here only a half season, before he signed to fourth-tier Mantova. One year later, he returned to Arezzo (at the time fourth-tier), before Rimini signed him. His next club was third-level S.P.A.L., before he was loaned to fellow third level Pavia. In the Lombardian team he scored 3 goals, but started the next season at Mantova. He spent the 2016–17 season at Forlì. In December 2017, after half year without club, he returned to Serie D, as Imolese signed him
In September 2020, signing for a lower category team, Olimpic Sansovino (1st Category Toscana). In January 2019, his first club, Arezzo signed him again.

References

Sources
 

1988 births
Living people
People from Castiglion Fibocchi
Sportspeople from Arezzo
Association football defenders
Italian footballers
S.S. Arezzo players
F.C. Grosseto S.S.D. players
Pisa S.C. players
Mantova 1911 players
Rimini F.C. 1912 players
S.P.A.L. players
F.C. Pavia players
Forlì F.C. players
Imolese Calcio 1919 players
Serie B players
Serie C players
Serie D players
Footballers from Tuscany